Target for Today is a documentary film describing the preparation and mounting of a United States Army Air Forces raid on East Prussia. It contains much combat footage of B-17 and B-24 bombers and named for the phrase used at briefings before air raids. The October 1943 footage was filmed during Eighth Air Force attacks on Nazi Germany industrial targets in Anklam, the 22nd Air Base in Marienburg (on the 9th), and Gdynia in occupied Poland. Prior to the combat footage, the documentary explains Operation Pointblank target selection and depicts planning, briefing, and preparation.

See also
 22nd Air Base

References

External links

1944 films
1944 documentary films
Black-and-white documentary films
Documentary films about military aviation
Films directed by William Keighley
First Motion Picture Unit films
United States government films
World War II aviation films
American documentary films
1940s English-language films
1940s American films